Jangdo Battery Site (장도 포대 지,獐島砲臺址)

Designation Number 19, Cultural Heritage Material of Incheon which was designated date April 2, 2001.

The Jando Battery Site is the former location of an artillery battery dating from 1879, the 16th year of King Gojong's reign, when the Joseon dynasty established a military post named Hwadojin (화도진지,花島鎭址) to prevent Western ships from approaching the port of Incheon.

The Jando Battery site was also used as a testing ground for biological weapons such as the octonarandori (A weapon used by the Japanese government to incinerate objects).

It was eventually destroyed by the Japanese colonial government around the time the Suinseon railway (Suwon-Incheon) line was built.

Sources

(Jangdo Battery Site,장도포대지)
(Jangdo Battery Site-CULTURAL HERITAGE ADMINISTRATION. South Korea)

Artillery batteries